Margarita Bolaños Arquín (born 1951 or 1952) is a Costa Rican politician and anthropologist who was president of the Citizens' Action Party (PAC).

Bolaños acted as secretary general of the PAC from 2009 to 2013. She became president of the party's National Executive Committee in August 2014, after Rodrigo Alberto Carazo resigned. Marcia González Aguiluz succeeded her as president in September 2017.

References

Living people
Citizens' Action Party (Costa Rica) politicians
21st-century Costa Rican women politicians
21st-century Costa Rican politicians
Costa Rican anthropologists
Costa Rican women anthropologists
21st-century anthropologists
1950s births